Ramona Hoage Edelin (born September 4, 1945) is an American academic, activist and consultant. Edelin is credited with introducing the term "African American" into the general vernacular. She has been named one of the most influential Black Americans by Ebony. Today, she serves as executive director of the DC Association of Charter Schools.

Early life and education

Ramona Hoage was born on September 4, 1945 in Los Angeles, California, to George and Annette Hoage. She is an only child. Hoage's family moved to Atlanta, Georgia and she attended elementary school in Georgia. Her family moved again, this time to Carbondale, Illinois and she briefly attended high school there, before her family moved to Massachusetts where Edelin attended Stockbridge High School. She graduated in 1963. In 1967, she married Kenneth Edelin. The couple had two children together and eventually divorced. 
She earned her bachelor's degree from Fisk University in 1969. While as Fisk, she became a member of Phi Beta Kappa. She earned her master's degree at the University of East Anglia in 1969. In 1981, she completed her PhD in philosophy at Boston University.

Career

Edelin taught at various institutions after completing college in 1969, including the University of Maryland, Emerson College, and Brandeis University. She founded the first African American Studies program at Northeastern University in 1972, a period in time when she is also credited with introducing the term "African American" to the academic community. She left Northeastern and started working for the National Urban Coalition in 1977.

In 1988, she met with Jessie Jackson and other Black leaders. During the meeting, Edelin shared the meaning and importance of the term "African American." Shortly thereafter, Jackson began regularly using the term, popularizing it in the American vernacular.

By 1989, she was serving as president and chief executive officer of the National Urban Coalition. She created the M. Carl Holman Leadership Development Institute and the Executive Leadership Program and created landmark education programs for African American children.

Edelin joined the board of the Congressional Black Caucus Foundation in 1991. In February 1998, after leaving the National Urban Coalition, she became the Foundation's executive director. That same year, she was appointed by then president Bill Clinton to the Presidential Board on Historically Black Colleges and Universities. She also visited South Africa with Clinton that year.

She left the Congressional Black Caucus Foundation in 2002. She served for one year, starting in 2003, as Vice President, Policy and Outreach of the Corporation for Enterprise Development. She now serves as executive director of the DC Association of Charter Schools.

Personal life

Edelin resides in Washington, D.C.

Further reading
Works by Ramona Hoage Edelin
We the Village: Achieving our Collective Greatness Now. Chicago: Third World Press (2014).

References

1945 births
Living people
Writers from Los Angeles
Writers from Washington, D.C.
Black studies scholars
Fisk University alumni
Alumni of the University of East Anglia
Boston University College of Arts and Sciences alumni
University System of Maryland faculty
Emerson College faculty
Brandeis University faculty
Northeastern University faculty
21st-century African-American women
21st-century African-American people
20th-century African-American women
20th-century African-American people